Buxton Park Arboretum 5.4 acres (2.2 ha) is an arboretum and botanical garden located at the intersection of North Buxton Street and West Girard Avenue, Indianola, Iowa. It is open to the public without charge.

The Arboretum was donated to the town in 1906 by William and Francis Buxton.  It now contains formal botanical gardens with twelve flowerbeds, an arboretum, a fountain, and a gazebo.

See also 

 List of botanical gardens in the United States

External links

Indianola Parks and Recreation

Indianola, Iowa
Arboreta in Iowa
Botanical gardens in Iowa
Protected areas of Warren County, Iowa